James Flynn ( – 11 February 2023) was an Irish film and television producer. He produced Vikings, The Last Duel, and The Banshees of Inisherin. Flynn died on 11 February 2023, at the age of 57.

References

External links

1960s births
Year of birth uncertain
2023 deaths
Irish film producers
Irish television producers
People from Dún Laoghaire–Rathdown
Alumni of University College Dublin